Rebarthy or Rebarthi is a village in Siddipet district in Telangana, India. The village population is 5,100.

Media 
Telugu newspapers, such as Namaste Telangana, Vaartha and Andhra Jyothy, are available.

Agriculture
The main occupation of the villagers is agriculture. A variety of crops are grown, including corn, turmeric, cotton, sunflower, Gingelly, castor, moong dal and groundnuts.[2] Rice, turmeric, corn, cotton are the major crops. Water resources for agriculture are poor. No freshwater lake is available for watering crops. Well water is unsuitable for agriculture. The four main types of lands are:
 Regadi (more fertile)
 Erragakka (moderately fertile)
 Telle dhubba (less fertile)
 Savuda Nella (not fertile). In Savuda nella, the ground does not absorb rainfall.

References 

Villages in Siddipet district